Galeana  is a genus of moths of the family Noctuidae.

Species
 Galeana basilinea
 Galeana midas

References
Natural History Museum Lepidoptera genus database

Cuculliinae